Matthew Bennett (born 1954) is a historian specialising in Medieval warfare. He taught as a Senior Lecturer in the Department of Communication and Applied Behavioural Science at The Royal Military Academy, Sandhurst, UK, for thirty years, retiring in 2014.  He holds a degree in History and an MA in Medieval History from King's College, London, where he studied under R. Allen Brown, and is a fellow of both the Society of Antiquaries and the Royal Historical Society.  In 2011 he was awarded a PhD By Means of Published Works by the University of Northampton. He is the author and editor of numerous books and articles on Medieval warfare.

Publications 

With Nicholas Hooper: 

With Jim Bradbury, Kelly DeVries, Iain Dickie, and Phyllis Jestice:

References 

British military writers
1954 births
Living people
British military historians
Alumni of King's College London
Academics of the Royal Military Academy Sandhurst
Fellows of the Royal Historical Society
Fellows of the Society of Antiquaries of London